The NCAA Division I FBS total offense leaders are career, single-season, and single-game leaders in total offense yards and touchdown responsibility. Both of these statistics are defined as the sum of passing and rushing yards or touchdowns, and do not include any receiving or returns stats. These lists are dominated by more recent players for several reasons:
 Since 1955, seasons have increased from 10 games to 11 and then 12 games in length.
 The NCAA didn't allow freshmen to play varsity football until 1972 (with the exception of the World War II years), allowing players to have four-year careers.
 Bowl games only began counting toward single-season and career statistics in 2002. This affects players such as Ty Detmer, though the vast majority of players on this list played after 2002 anyway.
 In recent decades, starting with the Southeastern Conference in 1992, FBS conferences have introduced their own championship games, which have always counted fully toward single-season and career statistics.
 The NCAA ruled that the 2020 season, heavily disrupted by COVID-19, would not count against the athletic eligibility of any football player. This gave every player active in that season the opportunity for five years of eligibility instead of the normal four.

Only seasons in which a team was considered to be a part of the Football Bowl Subdivision are included in these lists. Players such as Taylor Heinicke and Chad Pennington played for teams who reclassified to the FBS during their careers, and only their stats from the FBS years are eligible for inclusion. All records are current as of the end of the 2022 season.

Total offense yards
The career leader in total offense yards is Houston's Case Keenum. Keenum was granted a fifth year of eligibility after being injured in Houston's third game in 2010 but he would still top the list by nearly 2,500 yards if 2010 were not included. The second player on the list, Hawaii's Timmy Chang, also had a fifth season after being granted a medical redshirt after being injured in 2001. Chang broke the record previously held by BYU's Ty Detmer, who is the only player in the top 30 whose entire college career was in the 20th century. Two other players in the top 30, Chang and Philip Rivers of NC State, played their first college seasons in 2000, which depending on definitions is part of either the 20th or 21st century.

The single-season leader in passing yards is Joe Burrow, who is the only player to ever top 6,000 yards of total offense in a single season. Burrow's yards came in 15 games, while second place Bailey Zappe's yards came in 14 games, and third place B. J. Symons's yards came in just 13 games. Symons held the single-season record for 16 years after breaking the record previously set by Houston's David Klingler in 1990.

The single-game record belongs to Patrick Mahomes, whose 819 yards came in a 2016 loss.

While these lists have many of the same players as the passing leaders list, the player with the most career yards without appearing on the passing yards list is Nevada's Colin Kaepernick, whose 4,112 rushing yards gets him on the list, even as his 10,098 career passing yards ranks outside the top 100. Similarly, Louisville's Lamar Jackson's 2017 season ranks outside the top 100 in passing yards, but his 1,601 rushing yards bring him into the list. Although players of any position are eligible for inclusion, all players on all three lists are quarterbacks, as the rushing leaders on the career, single-season, and single-game lists of 6,405, 2,628, and 427 yards respectively, are significantly below the 30th ranked players on the lists below.

Touchdowns responsible for
Keenum also leads the touchdown list, with 155 passing and 23 rushing touchdowns over his 5-year career. He is followed by Baker Mayfield. The single-season record is shared by Burrow and Zappe, and Klingler holds the single game record with 11.

Similar to the yards list, every player in the career and single-season list is a quarterback, including Navy's Keenan Reynolds, whose career included 88 rushing touchdowns and 31 passing touchdowns. However, the single-game list does include two running backs, Howard Griffith and Jaret Patterson, who each had games with 8 rushing touchdowns.

References

Rushing leaders